Kiurike II  (alternatively spelled Gorige, Korike or Gurgen) was the third king of the Kingdom of Lori. He was succeeded by his son David II.

References

Kiurikian dynasty
Kings of Tashir-Dzoraget
Year of birth unknown
1089 deaths